William Halstead Sutphin (August 30, 1887 – October 14, 1972) was an American military officer, businessman, and Democratic Party politician who represented  for six terms from 1931 to 1943.

Early life and career
He was born on August 30, 1887, in Browntown, New Jersey and attended the public schools of Matawan, New Jersey. He attended the Woods Business College in Brooklyn and attended the officers training camp at Plattsburgh, New York in 1915.

He was Mayor of Matawan, New Jersey from 1915–1916 and 1921–1926. He served on the United States-Mexico border in 1916 (see Pancho Villa Expedition) with B Troop, First Squadron, New Jersey Cavalry.

During World War I he served in France from December 1917 to May 1919 and was discharged as captain in the Air Service. He was a factory representative for asphalt roofing from 1920 to 1931.

U.S. House of Representatives
Sutphin was elected as a Democrat to the Seventy-second Congress and to the five succeeding Congresses (March 4, 1931–January 3, 1943). He was an unsuccessful candidate for reelection in 1942 to the Seventy-eighth Congress.

Later career and death
After leaving office, he went on to be vice president of the M.J. Merkin Paint Co., in New York City. He retired in 1951 and resided in Berlin, Maryland.

Sutphin died in Salisbury, Maryland on October 14, 1972 and was interred in Arlington National Cemetery.

References

External links

William Halstead Sutphin at The Political Graveyard

1887 births
1972 deaths
United States Army Air Service pilots of World War I
People from Matawan, New Jersey
People from Old Bridge Township, New Jersey
Mayors of places in New Jersey
Burials at Arlington National Cemetery
Democratic Party members of the United States House of Representatives from New Jersey
People from Berlin, Maryland
20th-century American politicians
Military personnel from New Jersey